Lincoln Township is located in Ogle County, Illinois, USA. At the 2010 census, its population was 481 and it contained 199 housing units. Lincoln Township was originally formed as Haldane Township from portions of Buffalo and Mt. Morris Townships in September 1869. Haldane was renamed Lincoln in December 1873.

Geography

Demographics

References

External links 
City-data.com
Midwest Government Info
Illinois State Archives

Townships in Ogle County, Illinois
Populated places established in 1869
1869 establishments in Illinois
Townships in Illinois